Glenburn Tea Estate is a tea garden in the Rangli Rangliot CD block in the Darjeeling Sadar subdivision of the Darjeeling district in the Indian state of West Bengal.

History
Established in 1859 by a Scottish tea company, Glenburn Tea Estate has been run by the Kolkata-based Prakash family for four generations.
When East India Company's monopoly of the Chinese tea trade came to an end in the early 19th century, one of the first places they thought of for developing tea gardens was the Doon Valley in the foothills of the Himalayas. It also happened to be the ancestral home of the Prakash family. Lala Darshan Lal, the patriarch of the family, started as a small tea planter and grew to be tea magnate owning tea gardens across the country. Anand Prakash, Sudhir Prakash and Ansuman Prakash followed in his footsteps.

Locals call the garden Kimble and according to local legend, Kimble Murray, the first manager of the estate, still roams around the garden slopes, looking for a perfect cup of tea.

Geography

Glenburn tea
The Rangeet and the Rungdung flow through/ near the tea estate.

Glenburn produces some of the finest Darjeeling tea. It specialises in Black tea, but also produces other varieties.

Note: The map alongside presents some of the notable locations in the subdivision. All places marked in the map are linked in the larger full screen map.

Tea tourism
Tourists visiting Glenburn Tea Estate can stay in bungalows – the Burra Bungalow and Water Lily Bungalow. The first is the original planters bungalow, a heritage property restored to its old charm in 2001. The second one was added in 2008.

References

External links
 

Tea estates in Darjeeling district